U-9 or U9 may refer to:

 German submarine U-9, the designation of several German U-boats
 U-9, a U.S. Army designation for the Aero Commander 500, a light twin-engined aircraft
 U9, the IATA code for Tatarstan Airlines
 U9 (Berlin U-Bahn), a subway line in Berlin, Germany
 U9, a model of the Motorola ROKR cell phone
 Ultima IX: Ascension, a video game
 U9 League, a private university alliance in Taiwan.
 Juni